Chris Snyder (born December 5, 1974) is a former American football lineman who played seven seasons in the Arena Football League (AFL) with the Albany/Indiana Firebirds and Colorado Crush. He played college football at Pennsylvania State University.

College career
Snyder played college football for the Penn State Nittany Lions. He was a two-year starter for the Lions. He recorded 45 tackles, one forced fumble and one fumble recovery his senior year. He compiled career totals of 59 tackles and nine sacks. Snyder began his career at Penn State as a tight end and made the transition to defensive line after redshirting his freshman season.

Professional career
Snyder played for the AFL's Albany/Indiana Firebirds from 1999 to 2004, earning First Team All-Arena honors in 2002 and All-Ironman Team recognition in 2004. He was signed by the Colorado Crush of the AFL on May 10, 2006. He was released by the Crush on February 22, 2008.

References

External links
 Just Sports Stats

Living people
1974 births
American football defensive linemen
American football offensive linemen
Albany Firebirds players
Colorado Crush players
Indiana Firebirds players
Penn State Nittany Lions football players
Sportspeople from Chesapeake, Virginia
Players of American football from Virginia